Gaber Ahmed Asfour ((25 March 1944 – 31 December 2021) was an Egyptian academic and politician who was a professor at Cairo University from 1966. He was appointed the Minister of Culture on 1 February 2011. He had published Countering Fanaticism, Times of the Novel and In Defense of the Enlightenment, among others.

During the 2011 Egyptian protests, he was appointed minister of culture, but he resigned after only one week in office, citing health problems as the reason for his resignation. Asfour  died on 31 December 2021, at the age of 77.

References

1944 births
2021 deaths
Culture ministers of Egypt
National Democratic Party (Egypt) politicians
Cairo University alumni
Academic staff of Cairo University
People from El Mahalla El Kubra